Queen Draga is a 1920 Austrian silent film directed by Hans Otto and starring Magda Sonja, Karl Leiter and Hans Homma. It portrays Draga Mašin, the wife of Alexander I of Serbia, who was killed together with her husband in the May Coup of 1903.

Cast
Magda Sonja as Queen Draga 
Karl Leiter as King Alexander  
Hans Homma as Colonel Machin 
Louis Nerz as King Milan  
Maria West
Emmy Schleinitz
Anita Muthsam
Paul Askonas
Herr Weißhapel
Heinz Altringen
Herr Berndt

References

External links

1920s biographical films
Austrian biographical films
Films directed by Hans Otto
Austrian silent feature films
Films set in the 19th century
Films set in Serbia
Austrian black-and-white films